"Lazzarella" is a song composed by Domenico Modugno and Riccardo Pazzaglia. The song, with a performance by Aurelio Fierro, ranked second at the fifth edition of the Festival di Napoli. It also got an immediate commercial success, peaking at second place on the Italian hit parade. 
 
The song was later covered by several artists, including the same Modugno, Dalida, Renato Carosone, Nino D'Angelo, Roberto Murolo, Massimo Ranieri, Laila Kinnunen, Claudio Villa, Eugenio Bennato, Pietra Montecorvino, Marino Marini, Nunzio Gallo, Nilla Pizzi, Jos Cleber, Giacomo Rondinella, Mario Trevi, Olavi Virta, Renzo Arbore,  (accordion), and the tenor .

The song also inspired a comedy film with the same name, directed by Carlo Ludovico Bragaglia and starring Alessandra Panaro and Terence Hill.

Meaning 

The song is written in the Neapolitan language, which is related to Italian.

Lazzarella, the title of the song, is a colloquial word that refers to a woman who is a "little scoundrel" or a "little rascal". Compare it with the Italian word lazzarone, which means "scoundrel, rascal", and which has the masculine grammatical gender.

For instance, the final four lines of the song, "Ma, lazzarella comme sì, tu nun me pienze proprio a me, e rire pe m’o fà capì, ca perdo o tiempo appriesso a te" mean "But a little rascal as you are, you're not thinking about me at all, and you laugh to make me understand, that I’m wasting my time in chasing you".

Track listing

 7" single – Ld A 6102 
 "Lazzarella"  (Domenico Modugno, Riccardo Pazzaglia)
 "Napule, Sole Mio!" (Domenico Furnò, Nino Oliviero)

References

 

1957 singles
Italian songs
1957 songs
Domenico Modugno songs
Songs written by Domenico Modugno
Neapolitan songs